Uncle Tom is the title character of Harriet Beecher Stowe's 1852 novel, Uncle Tom's Cabin.

Uncle Tom may also refer to:

 Uncle Tom (film), a 2020 documentary film about Black conservatism in the United States
 Uncle Tom syndrome, a psychological coping skill in which individuals use passivity and submissiveness when confronted with a threat
 Uncle Tom Cobley, a humorous placeholder name in British English

See also 

 Uncle Tom's Cabin (disambiguation)